Abruzzi Ridge may refer to:
Abruzzi Spur or Ridge, on the South-East Ridge of K2
Abruzzi Ridge (Mount Saint Elias)